Mikolan is a village in the municipality of Yuxarı Nüvədi in the Lankaran Rayon of Azerbaijan.

References

Populated places in Lankaran District